Live in Japan '96 is a live album by the Berlin Contemporary Jazz Orchestra. One track was recorded in July 1996 at Nakano Public Hall in Tokyo, while the remaining tracks were recorded in August 1996 at Shin-Kobe Oriental Theatre in Kobe. The album was released in 1997 by DIW. The music was conducted by Alexander von Schlippenbach and Aki Takase.

Reception

In a review for AllMusic, Joslyn Lane wrote: "Live in Japan '96 is an excellent show from a premiere cast of musicians."

Bill Shoemaker, writing for Jazz Times, commented: "free improvisations are well-integrated into the structure of the works... Schlippenbach and Takase are a formidable composer/arranger/pianist/conductor tag-team; the Berlin Contemporary Jazz Orchestra is an excellent vehicle for their uncompromising work."

Track listing
 "Eric Dolphy Medley: The Prophet / Serene / Hat and Beard" (Eric Dolphy; arranged by Aki Takase) – 17:04
 "The Morlocks" (Alexander von Schlippenbach) – 15:46
 "Shijo No Ai" (traditional; arranged by Aki Takase) – 6:21
 "Way Down South Where the Blues Began" (W. C. Handy; arranged by Alexander von Schlippenbach) – 12:18
 "Jackhammer" (Alexander von Schlippenbach) – 10:29
 "Goodbye" (Gordon Jenkins; arranged by Willem Breuker) – 4:17

Track 2 recorded on July 31, 1996, at Nakano Public Hall, Tokyo. Remaining tracks recorded on August 6, 1996, at Shin-Kobe Oriental Theatre, Kobe.

Personnel 

 Alexander von Schlippenbach – piano, conductor
 Aki Takase – piano, conductor
 Eiichi Hayashi – alto saxophone
 Walter Gauchel – tenor saxophone
 Hiroaki Katayama – tenor saxophone, baritone saxophone
 Evan Parker – tenor saxophone, soprano saxophone
 Gerd Dudek – tenor saxophone, soprano saxophone, flute, clarinet
 Rudi Mahall – bass clarinet
 Axel Dörner – trumpet
 Henry Lowther – trumpet
 Issei Igarashi – trumpet
 Thomas Heberer – trumpet
 Haruki Sato – trombone
 Marc Boukouya – trombone
 Paul Rutherford – trombone
 Wolter Wierbos – trombone
 Nobuyoshi Ino – bass
 Paul Lovens – drums

References

Berlin Contemporary Jazz Orchestra albums
1997 live albums
Live big band albums
Live jazz albums
DIW Records live albums